World Vision International is an ecumenical Christian humanitarian aid, development, and advocacy organization. It was founded in 1950 by Robert Pierce as a service organization to provide care for children in Korea. In 1975, emergency and advocacy work was added to World Vision's objectives. It is active in over 100 countries with a total revenue including grants, product and foreign donations of USD $3.14 billion.

History 
The charity was co-founded in 1950 as World Vision Inc. by Robert Pierce, Kyung-Chik Han and Frank Phillips. It was founded after Pierce was invited to Korea by Han to speak at Young Nak Church, followed by another speech in Seoul. After the breakout of the Korean War weeks later, Pierce and Han continued to collaborate on relief efforts in the region. The first World Vision office opened later that year in Portland, Oregon, with a second office following in 1954 in Korea. During the early years, the charity operated as a missionary service organization meeting emergency needs in crisis areas in East Asia. World Vision operated as a missionary service organisation meeting emergency needs of children in crisis areas in East Asia following the Korean War.

In 1967, the Mission Advanced Research and Communication Center (MARC) was founded by Ed Dayton as a division of World Vision. It became the organizational backbone of the Lausanne Committee for World Evangelization, collected and published data about "unreached people" and also published the "Mission Handbook: North American Protestant Ministries Overseas".

During the 1970s, World Vision began training families in the agricultural skills necessary to build small farms, with the aim of promoting long term improvement and self-reliance in the communities. The organization also began installing water pumps for clean water, which caused infant mortality rates to drop. Volunteers now use the fresh water to teach gardening and irrigation and promote good health.

In order to restructure, the organization World Vision International was founded in 1977 by Walter Stanley Mooneyham the then president of World Vision. In 1979, World Vision also co-founded the Evangelical Council for Financial Accountability with the Billy Graham Evangelistic Association.

During the 1990s, World Vision International began focusing on the needs of children who had been orphaned in Uganda, Romania, and Somalia in response to AIDS, neglect, and civil war, respectively. World Vision began working with communities, health providers, faith-based organisations and people living with HIV and AIDS to encourage an end to stigmatisation, better understanding of HIV prevention and community care for those living with AIDS, and orphans left behind by the pandemic. They also joined the United Nations peacekeeping efforts to help those affected by civil war. World Vision also started to openly promote the international ban on land mines. In 1994 World Vision US moved to Washington State.

In 2022, WVI operated in more than 100 countries and had over 34,000 employees.

Organizational structure
World Vision Partnership operates as a federation of interdependent national offices governed by the same agreement but with three different levels of central control.
 Response Offices - under strong central control by World Vision International, registered in the host country as a branch of the main organization.
 Intermediate Stage National Offices with a separate board of directors
 Interdependently National Registered Offices -  autonomous in internal decision but expected to coordinate with World Vision International and bound to the Covenant of Partnership.

The Covenant of Partnership is a document that all national members of the World Vision Partnership have to sign. According to this document all national offices have to accept policies and decisions established by the International Board and must not establish an office or program outside their own national borders without the consent of World Vision International and the host country. Except for direct project founding, all funds intended for outside their national borders have to be remitted through World Vision International. The financial planning and budget principles adopted by the International Board have to be accepted as well as an examination of the financial affairs of the national offices by Partnership representatives.

An international board of directors oversees the World Vision partnership. The full board meets twice a year to appoint senior officers, approve strategic plans and budgets, and determine international policy. The current chairperson of the international board is Donna Shepherd. The international president is Andrew Morley. A percentage of the workforce in each country are citizens of that given territory. This is not common with numerous aid organisations, as they often use foreign aid workers.

Beliefs
World Vision's staff comes from a range of Christian denominations. Its staff includes followers of Protestantism, Catholicism and Eastern Orthodoxy. Around the world its staff includes followers of different religions or none. Some staff participate in religious services provided by WVI. They stress that one can be a Christian in any culture. However, World Vision also respects other religions that it encounters, stating that "to promote a secular approach to life would be an insult to them". Richard Stearns, president of World Vision US, stated that World Vision has a strict policy against proselytizing, which he describes as "using any kind of coercion or inducement to listen to a religious message before helping someone".

The World Vision Partnership and all of its national members are committed to the concept of transformational development, which is cast in a biblical framework and which is seen as a witness to the love of God for all humanity.

Programs

Activities include: emergency relief, education, health care, economic development, and promotion of justice. The organization  has consultative status with the United Nations Economic and Social Council and partnerships with UN agencies like UNICEF, WHO, UNHCR and ILO, and  financial records reveal that it has funded evangelical activities all over the world.

It also addresses factors that perpetuate poverty by what it describes as promoting justice. It supports community awareness of the collective ability to address unjust practices and begin working for change. It claims to speak out on issues such as child labor, debt relief for poor nations, and the use of children as combatants in armed conflict. World Vision International has endorsed the Universal Declaration of Human Rights and the United Nations Convention on the Rights of the Child. It claims to foster opportunities to help reduce conflict levels and to contribute to the peaceful resolution of hostilities and reconciliation of disputes.

World Vision encourages public awareness about the needs of others, the causes of poverty, and the nature of compassionate response. These efforts include collaboration with media and community participation in fundraising. In areas of the world that are considered too dangerous for news organizations to send their crews, World Vision's own videographers supply newscasters with footage of events from these areas. In its communications, the organization claims to uphold the dignity of children and families in presenting explanations of the causes and consequences of poverty, neglect, abuse and war.

In 2015, World Vision took part in operations to bring earthquake relief to Nepal. It was also involved in running a child sponsorship program bringing aid  to needy children in the wake of the Ebola outbreak in West Africa.

Criticism
After his resignation from the post of president, its founder Robert Pierce criticized the organization for its professionalization at the expense of its evangelical faith and founded Samaritan's Purse in 1970.

Accusations of misrepresentation

Some donors to World Vision's Sponsor a Child-type fundraising have reported feeling misled by the group's use of such funding for community rather than individual-specific projects. In a 2008 report on famine in Ethiopia, reporter Andrew Geoghegan, from Australian TV programme Foreign Correspondent, visited his 14-year-old sponsor child. The girl has "been part of a World Vision program all her life" yet says (in translated subtitle) "Until recently, I didn't know I had a sponsor." And when asked about her knowledge of World Vision sponsorship says, "Last time they gave me this jacket and a pen." Geoghegan was disconcerted to find that despite being "told by World Vision that [the girl] was learning English at school, and was improving ... she speaks no English at all".

In response, World Vision stated that "it unapologetically takes a community-based approach to development", in which the money is not directly provided to the family of the sponsored child. The organization argued that the "direct benefit" approach would result in jealousy among other community members without children and would not work. Foreign Correspondent replied to World Vision concerning child sponsorship, showing contradictions between the organization's literature that creates the impression that donated money goes directly to the sponsor child and evidence of cases where supposedly sponsored children received little if any benefit.

Evangelism
World Vision has been criticized for evangelism in India, with the political weekly Tehelka citing World Vision India's involvement with AD2000. Valerie Tarico, a commentator on religious and social topics, points out that World Vision defines proselytism as "Proselytism takes place whenever assistance is offered on condition that people must listen or respond to a message or as an inducement to leave one and join another part of the Christian church." which does not in general exclude evangelism. Furthermore, she mentions the phrase "serving as a witness to the gospel of Jesus Christ" as part of World Vision's description of its mission and identifies the word "witness" as an evangelical code word for seeking converts.

Israel and Palestine
In 1982, after World Vision publicly criticized Israel's actions in Palestinian refugee camps near Sidon and Tyre, it came under attack from conservative evangelicals and the government of Israel. In spite of this pressure, World Vision president Mooneyham presented to the eight hundred thousand readers of World Vision Magazine a report "showing 255 bodies and ankle-deep body fluids left in a school basement by an Israeli bomb." In the September 1982 issue of World Vision Magazine President Stanley Mooneyham was quoted describing Israeli actions with the behavior of Hitler's army, "reminiscent of Warsaw". In the same month Mooneyham was forced to resign when, according to former World Vision employee Ken Waters, his leadership style was criticized; he was replaced as President by Ted Engstrom.

In February 2012, based on information provided by the Shurat HaDin - Israel Law Center, World Vision Australia allegedly provided "financial aid to a Gaza-based terrorist group", the Union of Agricultural Work Committees (UAWC), which they also alleged is a "front for terror group the Popular Front for the Liberation of Palestine". WV had "suspended its dealings" with UAWC until the outcome of the investigation. WV resumed working with UAWC after AusAID and World Vision found the allegations were unfounded. The Israel Law Center considers World Vision's response to be a whitewash and maintains that the allegations have not been refuted.

On June 15, 2016, Mohammad El Halabi, manager of World Vision in Gaza, was arrested at the Erez border crossing and charged by Israeli prosecutors with channeling its funds directly to Hamas, a listed terror organization.  A senior official with Shin Bet, Israel's internal security agency, stated that Halabi was recruited by the military wing of Hamas in 2004 and instructed to penetrate World Vision. According to the Israeli newspaper Haaretz, Halabi is accused of transferring cash to Hamas to help it in digging military tunnels and purchasing weapons. Muhammad Mahmoud, Halabi's lawyer, told Haaretz that his client has nothing to do with Hamas and that the fact that the investigation had lasted 55 days proves that there is a problem with evidence. Israel's Shin Bet intelligence agency claims that about $48 million of World Vision resources were funneled to Hamas in just six years and another $80,000 was used for building a Hamas position in Beit Hanon and for paying salaries of Hamas members who fought against Israel in the 2014 war. World Vision confirmed that its funds are spent in accordance with legal requirements that contribute to peace and that the charity works closely with the UN and Red Cross. The charity initially defended Halabi as a "humanitarian".

In August 2016, Israeli officials claimed that the World Vision organization was providing the military wing of Hamas with tens of millions of dollars in Gaza. World Vision has denounced these allegations which come amid Israeli campaigns against the non-governmental organizations that worked with Palestinians in the West Bank and Gaza Strip.

The Australian Department of Foreign Affairs and Trade immediately suspended all funding of Palestinian programs by World Vision. World Vision Australia chief executive, Tim Costello, accepted this move as being the correct thing to do pending a proper investigation of the allegations. A review of the Australian government came to the conclusion that no Australian taxpayer money was diverted to Hamas.

Notable affiliated persons 
 Hugh Jackman
 Kris Allen
 Paul Brandt
 Richard Stearns
 Meghan, Duchess of Sussex
Liam Cunningham
 Chillinit

References

External links
 Official website

Christian organizations established in 1950
Christian charities based in the United States
International climate change organizations
Development charities based in the United States
Children's charities based in the United States
Emergency organizations
International medical and health organizations
Christian organizations established in the 20th century
Educational organizations based in the United States
Christian educational organizations
1950 establishments in California
Charities based in California
Evangelical Christian humanitarian organizations
Organizations based in Los Angeles County, California
Monrovia, California